The Slohokej League (Slohokej Liga) was a multinational ice hockey league in Europe. The competition was made up from teams from Slovenia, Croatia, Serbia and Austria. A few teams in the league were the farm teams for clubs that played in the EBEL – Erste Bank Eishockey Liga (Jesenice and Olimpija). Other Slovenian teams used the league for future development of young Slovenian players and had the majority of their team rosters made up from players of the age of 21 and younger.

Teams

Slohokej League seasons

See also
Erste Bank Eishockey Liga
Slovenian Ice Hockey League
Yugoslav Ice Hockey League

External links

 
Defunct multi-national ice hockey leagues in Europe
Ice hockey leagues in Slovenia
Ice hockey leagues in Croatia
Ice hockey leagues in Austria
Ice hockey leagues in Serbia
Sports leagues established in 2009
2012 disestablishments in Europe
Articles containing video clips
Sports leagues disestablished in 2012
2009 establishments in Europe